The 2014–15 Maine Black Bears men's basketball team  represented the University of Maine during the 2014–15 NCAA Division I men's basketball season. The Black Bears, led by first year head coach Bob Walsh, played their home games at  Cross Insurance Center and were members of the America East Conference. They finished the season 3–27, 2–14 in America East play to finish in a tie for eighth place. They lost in the quarterfinals of the America East tournament to Albany.

Roster

Schedule

|-
!colspan=9 style="background:#000050; color:#FFFFFF;"| Exhibition

|-
!colspan=9 style="background:#000050; color:#FFFFFF;"|Regular season

|-
!colspan=9 style="background:#000050; color:#FFFFFF;"| America East tournament

References

Maine
Maine Black Bears men's basketball seasons
2014 in sports in Maine
2015 in sports in Maine